The Parque Fundidora Station is a station on Line 1 of the Monterrey Metro. It is located in the intersection of Pablo A. de la Garza Avenue and Colon Avenue in the Pablo A. de la Garza neighborhood. The station was opened on 25 April 1991 as part of the inaugural section of Line 1, going from San Bernabé to Exposición.

This station serves the Pablo A. de la Garza and Acero neighborhoods (Colonias Pablo A. de la Garza y Acero), this station is important due to its proximity to the public Fundidora Park and the Monterrey Arena. It is accessible for people with disabilities.

This station is named for the nearby Fundidora Park (Parque Fundidora in Spanish), and its logo represents trees in a park.

References

Metrorrey stations
Railway stations opened in 1991
1991 establishments in Mexico